Alexandru-Claudiu Oancea (born 25 May 1993) is a Romanian rugby union footballer. He plays as a hooker for professional SuperLiga club Știința Baia Mare.

Club career
Oancea started playing rugby in 2008, at 15 years old, signing with Romanian youth club CS Metrorex București on 2 May 2008. After four years with Metrorex, Oancea signed on 25 July 2012 a 5-year contract with SuperLiga side Știința Baia Mare. At the end of his 5-year contract with Baia Mare, Oancea was signed by his hometown side, CSM București. In 2019, following the dissolution of his former club, CSM, he signed once again with Știința Baia Mare.

Provincial / State sides
Oancea was also selected between 2014 and 2015 for the State side assembled to play in the European Cups, namely București Wolves.

International career
Oancea is also selected for Romania's national team, the Oaks, making his international debut during the 2014 IRB Nations Cup in a test match against Emerging Ireland.

References

External links

1993 births
Living people
Rugby union players from Bucharest
Romanian rugby union players
Romania international rugby union players
CSM Știința Baia Mare players
CSM București (rugby union) players
București Wolves players
Rugby union hookers